E3 ubiquitin-protein ligase RNF14 is an enzyme that in humans is encoded by the RNF14 gene.

Function 

The protein encoded by this gene contains a RING zinc finger, a motif known to be involved in protein-protein interactions. This protein interacts with androgen receptor (AR) and may function as a coactivator that induces AR target gene expression in prostate. A dominant negative mutant of this gene has been demonstrated to inhibit the AR-mediated growth of prostate cancer. This protein also interacts with class III ubiquitin-conjugating enzymes (E2s) and may act as a ubiquitin-ligase (E3) in the ubiquitination of certain nuclear proteins. Five alternatively spliced transcript variants encoding two distinct isoforms have been reported. Another function of RNF14 protein relates to its regulation of the inter-relationship between bioenergetic status and inflammation. It influences the expression of mitochondrial and immune-related genes in skeletal muscle including cytokines and interferon regulatory factors.

Interactions 

RNF14 has been shown to interact with the Androgen receptor.

See also 
 RING finger domain

References

Further reading

External links 
 

Gene expression
Transcription coregulators
RING finger proteins